The Altar Tour is the second official headlining concert tour by American musician Banks. It is in support of her second studio album The Altar (2016). The tour began on February 24, 2017, in Antwerp, Belgium and concluded on November 3, 2017, in Rotterdam, Netherlands.

Background
On September 19, 2016, 11 days before the release of The Altar, Banks announced the first leg of dates. They consisted of 11 tour dates across Europe. On January 18, 2017, Banks announced the first batch of North American tour dates, and on February 28, 2017, even more North American dates were announced. Tour dates for various music festivals across North America as well as Australian and Asian dates were announced at later times. On May 22, 2017, Banks announced a second date of European dates that will take place in October and November 2017. On June 1, 2017, it was announced that the Asian leg of the tour was cancelled due to unknown unforeseen circumstances. On June 6, 2017, Banks announced another leg of North American concerts that took place from July to September 2017.

Set list
This set list is representative of the show on March 8, 2017, in Paris, France. It does not represent all dates throughout the tour.

 "Poltergeist"
 "Fuck with Myself"
 "Gemini Feed"
 "Trainwreck"
 "Waiting Game"
 "This Is What It Feels Like"
 "Mind Games"
 "Better"
 "Weaker Girl"
 "Mother Earth"
 "Drowning"
 "Judas"
 "Beggin for Thread"
 "Haunt"
 "27 Hours"
 "This Is Not About Us"

Tour dates

Cancelled shows

References

2017 concert tours